Alkiviadis 'Alkis' Markopouliotis (born 13 August 1996) is a Greek professional footballer who plays as a centre-back for Super League 2 club Proodeftiki.

References

1996 births
Living people
Greece under-21 international footballers
Greece youth international footballers
Super League Greece players
Football League (Greece) players
Super League Greece 2 players
AEK Athens F.C. players
Doxa Drama F.C. players
Olympiacos Volos F.C. players
Panachaiki F.C. players
Proodeftiki F.C. players
Association football defenders
Footballers from Athens
Greek footballers